Floppy usually refers to a floppy disk.

Floppy may also refer to:

 Floppy-disk controller
 The Floppy Show, an American children's television series
 Mr Floppy, an Australian rock band
 Mr. Floppy, a talking, toy rabbit from the television sitcom Unhappily Ever After
 An American comic book
 Floppy, a dog in the children's novel series The Magic Key by Roderick Hunt and Alex Brychta